Lathrocordulia metallica is a species of dragonfly in the family Austrocorduliidae,
known as the Western swiftwing. 
It is a medium-sized, bronze to black coloured dragonfly without pale markings,
endemic to south-western Australia,
where it inhabits streams.

Gallery

Note
There is uncertainty about which family Lathrocordulia metallica best belongs to: Austrocorduliidae, Synthemistidae, or Corduliidae.

See also
 List of Odonata species of Australia

References

Austrocorduliidae
Odonata of Australia
Insects of Australia
Endemic fauna of Australia
Taxa named by Robert John Tillyard
Insects described in 1911